SU45 is a Polish diesel locomotive. It had been made for universal use: heavy transport or passenger transport alike.

History
This locomotive is in fact a SP45 with a modified heating system – a steam boiler was replaced by an electric heating system. During 2010 4 locomotives were rebuilt to class ST45.

In 2020, the last locomotive for passenger use from national operators was retired, and the two remaining are in use of private companies.

Production

Nicknames
These locos used to be called by the following names:
Fiat - because of the diesel engine licensed by Fiat
Suka (eng. bitch) - from the two first letters of the code name

See also
Polish locomotives designation

External links

Modern Locos Gallery
Rail Service
Mikoleje
Chabówka Rail Museum

Co′Co′ locomotives
Diesel-electric locomotives of Poland
Railway locomotives introduced in 1970
Standard gauge locomotives of Poland